Kennard Chike Backman (born February 26, 1993) is a former American football tight end. He played college football at UAB and was drafted by the Green Bay Packers in the sixth round of the 2015 NFL Draft.

Professional career

Green Bay Packers
Backman was selected in the sixth round (213rd overall) by the Green Bay Packers in the 2015 NFL Draft. On May 8, 2015, he signed a contract with the Packers. In his rookie season, Backman appeared in seven games, playing predominantly on special teams. He saw his first playoff action in the Packers' divisional playoff game against the Arizona Cardinals, registering a tackle on special teams. On August 30, 2016, Backman was placed on injured reserve.

New England Patriots
On November 12, 2016, Backman was signed to the Patriots' practice squad. He was released three days later. He was re-signed to the practice squad on November 29, 2016 but was released again three days later.

Detroit Lions
On December 31, 2016, Backman was signed to the Lions' practice squad. He signed a reserve/future contract with the Lions on January 9, 2017. He was waived by the Lions on May 11, 2017.

Statistics
Source: NFL.com

References

External links
 Green Bay Packers bio
 UAB Blazers bio
 

1993 births
Living people
Players of American football from Atlanta
American football tight ends
UAB Blazers football players
Green Bay Packers players
New England Patriots players
Detroit Lions players